Ines Kresović (Serbian Cyrillic: Инес Кресовић, born 20 February 1984 in Šibenik, SFR Yugoslavia) is a Serbian female basketball player.

External links
Profile at eurobasket.com

1984 births
Living people
Serbs of Croatia
Basketball players from Šibenik
Shooting guards
Serbian women's basketball players
ŽKK Crvena zvezda players
Beşiktaş women's basketball players